located in Minato-ku, Osaka is currently Japan's second lowest mountain.(The lowest mountain title is now held by Mount Hiyori in Sendai,Miyagi Prefecture. ) The definition of a "mountain" used here is any elevation described as a mountain on a topographic map published by the Geographical Survey Institute of Japan, though it is disputed that the mountain lacks credibility because it is not a natural part of the landscape. The mountain's peak is 4.53 meters above sea level, and will bear more resemblance to a hill than a mountain to the casual observer. A small port is located nearby, and much of the mountain's surface has been converted into a park.

History

Mount Tenpō was formed in 1831 (Tenpō year 2) as the deposit for earth dug up from dredging the Ajigawa river to allow easier access to Osaka for large ships and to prevent floods. The mountain had an elevation of about 20 meters at the time, and served as a marker for ships entering the Ajigawa river to head to the city of Osaka. Cherry blossom and pine trees were planted on the mountain as people began to set up shops in the area, and the mountain gradually became the visitor attraction that it is now. Images of children playing in this area were sketched in ukiyo-e by Utagawa Hiroshige and other artists.

Part of the mountain was leveled to set up an artillery unit to protect the river pass after the fall of the Tokugawa shogunate. As industrialization progressed in the Taishō and Shōwa periods, overuse of groundwater resulted in subsidence, lowering the mountain's elevation even further. This caused the mountain's name to be erased from topographic maps until it was reinstated due to fierce protests from local residents.

Location
The mountain is located about 400 meters north of the Ōsakakō Station stop of the Chūō Line.

Mount Tenpō Park
Surrounded by a large levee, the park itself contains large hills (the deposits for earth dug up in constructing underground train tunnels) which have much higher elevations than the actual "peak" of the mountain.

A stone memorial of the Meiji Emperor's first sea-borne military parade in 1876 is located next to the triangular peak of the mountain. The park's clock-tower was originally a prop for a television show produced by the Kansai Telecasting Corporation, but was later donated to the prefecture. The park contains several art depicting the area during the Edo period.

Surrounding area
The mountain is located near several leisure and amusement facilities, including the Osaka Aquarium Kaiyukan and the Suntory Museum. It is also a short ferry ride away from Universal Studios Japan on  via the Tempozan Ferry Terminal.  The Hanshin Expressway also has an exit named after Mount Tenpō.

Mount Tenpō Mountaineering Club and Rescue Team
In 1997, in reaction to Mount Tenpō being listed as a mountain on the topological maps in 1996, two citizens founded the Mount Tenpō Mountaineering Club with the goal of establishing Mount Tenpō as a tourist attraction. The club held annual "climbing events" on new year's day and April 5th (in reference to Mount Tenpō's 4.5 meter elevation) which by 2000 drew the attendance of around a thousand people as well as newspaper and television coverage.

In the spirit of いちびり (ichibiri, an Osaka dialect term meaning "taking a joke to the extreme") they issued commemorative "mountain climbing certificates" at these events and also to anyone who would apply and pay the issuance fee of 10 Yen. The club also formed a Mount Tenpō Rescue Team, staffed by two members.

In 2005, the club ceased its operation out of a café in the vicinity of Mount Tenpō. The reopening of the club was announced for 2010, but their website since closed and current operations are unknown.

See also 

 List of the 100 famous mountains in Japan
 List of mountains and hills of Japan by height
 List of records of Japan

References

Geography of Osaka
Tenpo
Tourist attractions in Osaka
Parks and gardens in Osaka